Lexicon is a novel written by Max Barry. Published in 2013, it is Barry's fifth novel, following Machine Man, published two years earlier.

Plot summary
In a school in Virginia, children are taught the art of persuasion instead of usual subjects. They learn in detail how to handle the power of language to control other individuals by breaking them down into psychographic markers. The most successful students graduate and join a nameless, powerful and secretive organization whose members are called "poets". This society believes that revealing one's identities and feelings is extremely dangerous because it can make the mind susceptible to manipulation.

Emily Ruff, a witty orphan from San Francisco, is recruited by members of the organization and taken to the school. After passing the strange and rigorous entrance exams, she is taught the fundamentals of persuasion by Bronte, Eliot, and Lowell, who have adopted pseudonyms to conceal their true identities. Emily gradually becomes a prodigy in the school, until she commits the fatal mistake of falling in love.

Wil Jamieson, an apparently innocent man, is ambushed by two men in an airport bathroom, who claim that he is the key to a secret war between rival factions of poets. Wil eventually discovers that his entire past is a lie and must travel to the decimated town of Broken Hill, Australia to uncover the truth about who he is.

At the point in which Emily's and Wil's narratives conjoin, the shocking plot of the poets is revealed in full, the number of deaths increases, and the world nears a crisis event in which all language will become meaningless.

External links
 Lexicon on Max Barry's personal website

2013 Australian novels
Novels by Max Barry
Australian science fiction novels
Australian thriller novels
Penguin Press books